Anne Vabarna (21 December 1877 in Võpolsova – 7 December 1964 in Tonja) was a Seto singer. In her lifetime she recorded over 140,000 verses, most notably her composition of the Seto national epic 'Peko', depicting the tale of the Seto hero who provides freedom for the Seto people. Her repertoire also includes songs of traditional Seto lyric and lyric-epic types, children's songs, prayers, fifty two bridal laments, improvisations (dedicated to collectors of folklore, statesmen, doctors, guests-all in all over 20,000 verses), epic compositions and folk tales.

References

1877 births
1964 deaths
People from Setomaa Parish
Estonian folk-song collectors
19th-century Estonian women singers
20th-century Estonian women singers
Women folklorists